Memoirs of a Geisha is a 2005 drama film directed by Rob Marshall and written by Robin Swicord. The screenplay is based on the novel of the same name by Arthur Golden, which follows the fictional story of Chiyo Sakamoto (Suzuka Ohgo and Zhang Ziyi), who, as a young girl, leaves behind her fishing village and becomes Sayuri Nitta, a celebrated geisha working in Kyoto, Japan, before and after World War II. The film also stars Ken Watanabe as Sayuri's love interest, Gong Li as her rival, and Michelle Yeoh as her mentor. It had a limited theatrical release in the United States from December 9, 2005, before it went on a wide release on December 23, 2005. Memoirs of a Geisha grossed a worldwide box office total of over $162 million, against an estimated budget of $85 million.

Memoirs of a Geisha garnered various awards and nominations following its release, with nominations ranging from recognition of the cast's acting performances, particularly those of Zhang and Li, to its costume design, cinematography, and John Williams' score. The film received six nominations at the 78th Academy Awards and won three at the ceremony. Production designer John Myhre won the Art Directors Guild Award for Excellence in Production Design for a Period Film for his work on the film, while cinematographer Dion Beebe won three awards from the American Society of Cinematographers, Australian Cinematographers Society, and the Australian Film Institute. At the 59th British Academy Film Awards, Memoirs of a Geisha won two awards from six nominations. The location crew were recognised at the California on Location Awards, where they won two awards. Memoirs of a Geisha received three nominations at the 11th Critics' Choice Awards; Williams won Best Composer. 

The film earned five nominations from the Gold Derby Film Awards, with costume designer Colleen Atwood going on to win Best Costume Design. She also received the Costume Designers Guild Award for Excellence in Period Film. The sound and dialogue artists won one award out of three nominations from the Golden Reel Awards. At the 63rd Golden Globe Awards, Zhang earned a nomination for Best Actress in a Drama Motion Picture, while Williams won Best Original Score. Williams would go on to win two awards from a total of six nominations for his score at the GoldSpirit Awards, as well as the Grammy Award for Best Score Soundtrack for Visual Media and two IFMCA Awards. Producers Lucy Fisher and Douglas Wick were honored at the 2005 Hollywood Film Festival, along with Atwood, who was named Costume Designer of the Year. 

Film editor Pietro Scalia was awarded the Special Silver Ribbon from the Nastro d'Argento. Memoirs of a Geisha was named as one of the Top Ten Films at the 2005 National Board of Review Awards. Gong also won the National Board of Review Award for Best Supporting Actress accolade. The film received a total of nine nominations at the 10th Satellite Awards, including Best Film. Swicord went on to win Best Adapted Screenplay. Zhang's performance earned her nominations for the NAACP Image Award for Outstanding Actress in a Motion Picture, New York Film Critics Circle Award for Best Actress, and the Screen Actors Guild Award for Outstanding Performance by a Female Actor in a Leading Role. She was also nominated for Sexiest Performance at the 2006 MTV Movie Awards. At the 27th Young Artist Awards, Suzuka Ohgo won Best Supporting Young Actress.

Accolades

Notes
 for "Best Production Company or Location Team of the Year": Mike Fantasia, Madeline Bell, Peter Costelli, Linda Emmons-Cunningham, Saisie M. Jang, Dan Kemp, Donny Martino Jr., Lori A. Balton, Kenneth Hunter, Peter Moody, Matthew Riutta

 for "Best Dialogue and ADR in a Feature Film": Wylie Stateman (supervising sound editor); Renée Tondelli (supervising adr/dialogue editor); Linda Folk (adr editor); Laura Harris Atkinson, Julie Feiner, Michael Hertlein, Michelle Pazer (dialogue editors)

 for "Best Sound Effects and Foley in a Feature Film": Harry Cohen, Wylie Stateman (supervising sound editors); Dino Dimuro, Hector C. Gika, Ann Scibelli, Branden Spencer (sound editors); Michael Broomberg, Gary A. Hecker (foley artists)

References
General

Specific

External links
 

Lists of accolades by film